Ceriporiopsis jelicii is a species of fungus belonging to the family Meruliaceae.

References

Polyporales